Ali Ammar may refer to:

Ali La Pointe (Ali Ammar, 1930–1957), Algerian freedom fighter
Ali Ammar (actor), Canadian actor 
Ali Ammar (politician) (born 1956), Lebanese politician